The Palestinian Declaration of Independence formally established the State of Palestine, and was written by Palestinian poet Mahmoud Darwish and proclaimed by Yasser Arafat on 15 November 1988 (5 Rabiʽ al-Thani 1409) in Algiers, Algeria. It had previously been adopted by the Palestinian National Council (PNC), the legislative body of the Palestine Liberation Organization (PLO), by a vote of 253 in favour, 46 against, and 10 abstaining. It was read at the closing session of the 19th PNC to a standing ovation. Upon completing the reading of the declaration, Arafat, as Chairman of the PLO, assumed the title of "President of Palestine." In April 1989, the PLO Central Council elected Arafat as the first President of the State of Palestine.

Background
On 28 October 1974, the 1974 Arab League summit held in Rabat designated the PLO as the "sole legitimate representative of the Palestinian people and reaffirmed their right to establish an independent state of urgency."

Legal justification for the declaration was based on United Nations General Assembly Resolution 181 (II) of 29 November 1947, which provided for the termination and partition of the British Mandate into two states. On 14 May 1948 the British mandate ended, the State of Israel was declared and the Arab Legion of Transjordan (later Jordan) invaded the West Bank (only to annex it in 1950). In September 1948 Egyptian forces captured the Gaza strip and kept it under military rule. Until the Six-Day War in June 1967 these two territories remained under Jordanian and Egyptian rule.

Despite the 1988 proclamation of the State of Palestine, at the time the Palestine Liberation Organization did not exercise control over any territory, and designated Jerusalem as the capital of Palestine, which was under Israeli control and claimed by it as Israel's capital. The PLO was hence a government in exile between 1988 and 1994.

The PLO began to exercise a limited rule in the Areas A and B of the West Bank and part of the Gaza Strip as a consequence of the 1994 Gaza-Jericho Agreement, under the umbrella of the Palestinian National Authority. In 2012, Palestine was upgraded to the status of non-member observer state in the UN.

Significance

The declaration concerned the Palestine region, as defined by the borders of the British Mandate of Palestine, which includes the whole of the State of Israel as well as the West Bank and the Gaza strip (at the time part of the Israeli Civil Administration). It references the United Nations Partition Plan for Palestine of 1947 and "UN resolutions since 1947" in general as providing legitimacy to Palestinian statehood.

The Partition Plan served as the basis for Israel's declaration of independence, but was not accepted by the Palestinian Arab leadership at the time. Though, in September 1948, the All-Palestine Government was declared within the Gaza Strip as an Egyptian protectorate and recognized by most members of the Arab League, which is regarded by some as the first attempt to establish an independent Palestinian state; All-Palestine had however been dissolved by Egypt several years later. The 1988 declaration does not explicitly recognize the State of Israel. However, an accompanying document that explicitly mentions UN Security Council Resolution 242, and Yasser Arafat's statements in Geneva a month later were accepted by the United States as sufficient to interpret the declaration as recognizing Israel in its pre-1967 boundaries.

The declaration's reference to Palestine being the "land of the three monotheistic faiths" has been held as recognising the Jewish historical connection to the land. Referring to "the historical injustice inflicted on the Palestinian Arab people resulting in their dispersion and depriving them of their right to self-determination," the declaration recalled the Treaty of Lausanne (1923) and UN General Assembly Resolution 181 as supporting the rights of Palestinians to statehood. The declaration then proclaims a "State of Palestine on our Palestinian territory with its capital Jerusalem". The borders of the state are not specified. The population of the state was referred to by the statement: "The State of Palestine is the state of Palestinians wherever they may be". The state was defined as an Arab country by the statement: "The State of Palestine is an Arab state, an integral and indivisible part of the Arab nation".

Consequences
The declaration was accompanied by a PNC call for multilateral negotiations on the basis of UN Security Council Resolution 242. This call was later termed "the Historic Compromise", as it implied acceptance of the "two-state solution", namely that it no longer questioned the legitimacy of the State of Israel. The PNC's political communiqué accompanying the declaration called only for withdrawal from "Arab Jerusalem" and the other "Arab territories occupied." Yasser Arafat's statements in Geneva a month later were accepted by the United States as sufficient to remove the ambiguities it saw in the declaration and to fulfill the longheld conditions for open dialogue with the United States.

As a result of the declaration, the United Nations General Assembly (UNGA) convened, inviting Yasser Arafat, Chairman of the PLO to give an address. United Nations General Assembly Resolution 43/177 was adopted "acknowledging the proclamation of the State of Palestine by the Palestine National Council on 15 November 1988," and it was further decided that "the designation 'Palestine' should be used in place of the designation 'Palestine Liberation Organization' in the United Nations system." One hundred and four states voted for this resolution, forty-four abstained, and two – the United States and Israel – voted against. By mid-December, 75 states had recognised Palestine, rising to 93 states by February 1989.

On 29 November 2012, the United Nations General Assembly adopted resolution 67/19 upgrading Palestine to non-member observer state status in the United Nations. It was adopted by the sixty-seventh session of the United Nations General Assembly on the date of the International Day of Solidarity with the Palestinian People and the 65th anniversary of the adoption by the General Assembly of resolution 181(II) on the Future Government of Palestine. The draft resolution was proposed by Palestine's representative at the United Nations. It, however, maintains the status of the Palestinian Liberation Organization as the representative of the Palestinian people within the United Nations system.

On 31 December 2014, the United Nations Security Council voted down a resolution demanding the end of Israeli occupation and Palestinian statehood by 2017. Eight members voted for the Resolution (Russia, China, France, Argentina, Chad, Chile, Jordan, Luxembourg). However the resolution did not get the minimum of nine votes needed to pass the resolution. Australia and the United States voted against the resolution, with the United Kingdom, Lithuania, Nigeria, South Korea and Rwanda abstaining.

See also
 All-Palestine Government
 Proposals for a Palestinian state
 Jordanian annexation of the West Bank
 Occupation of the Gaza Strip by the United Arab Republic
 International recognition of the State of Palestine
 State of Palestine
 Palestinian nationalism
 Israeli Declaration of Independence

Footnotes

References

External links 
 translated by Edward Said
 Original text in Arabic (with a readable option of translation by Google)
 Translation at UN website (errata)
 Palestinian Statehood: Trapped between Rhetoric and Realpolitik, Paul Eden, in The International and Comparative Law Quarterly, Vol. 62, No. 1 (JANUARY 2013), pp. 225–239]. (JSTOR)

Bibliography

Declaration of Independence
Palestinian nationalism
Palestine Liberation Organization
Palestinian law
Declarations of independence
1988 in international relations
Yasser Arafat
1988 in the Israeli Civil Administration area
1988 in Algeria
November 1988 events in Asia
1988 documents